The Church of the Holy Cross  is a Roman Catholic church in the Spanish city of Cádiz. It was the cathedral of the Diocese of Cádiz y Ceuta between 1602 and 1838, when the new Cádiz Cathedral was completed.

Originally built in 1262 after the conquest of the city by Alfonso X, it was completely rebuilt by 1602 after the first building was burned down by a combined Anglo-Dutch fleet commanded by Admiral Edward Howard, who sacked Cádiz in 1596.

References

External links
 

Buildings and structures in Cádiz
Bien de Interés Cultural landmarks in the Province of Cádiz
Churches in the Province of Cádiz